Microplanus is a genus of dwarf spiders that was first described by Alfred Frank Millidge in 1991.

Species
 it contains two species:
Microplanus mollis Millidge, 1991 (type) – Colombia
Microplanus odin Miller, 2007 – Panama

See also
 List of Linyphiidae species (I–P)

References

Araneomorphae genera
Linyphiidae
Spiders of Central America
Spiders of South America